The Leader of the Labour Party is the most senior politician within the Labour Party in Ireland. Since 24 March 2022, the office has been held by Ivana Bacik, following the resignation of Alan Kelly as leader of the party.

In a review of procedures at the party's 2017 conference, the position of Deputy Leader was abolished after a year of lying vacant, and the nomination and seconding of new leadership candidates was extended to Senators and MEPs as well as TDs.

Leaders

Deputy leaders

See also
History of the Labour Party
Leader of Fine Gael
Leader of Fianna Fáil
Leader of Sinn Féin

References

Labour Party (Ireland)
 
Labour Party Ireland
Republic of Ireland politics-related lists